Marie Strinden is a Democratic member of the North Dakota House of Representatives, representing the 18th district. Strinden was the executive director of the North Valley Arts Council, stepping down in 2014 after financial irregularities were discovered.

References

External links
 
Legislative page
Twitter account

Living people
Women state legislators in North Dakota
University of North Dakota alumni
Politicians from Grand Forks, North Dakota
21st-century American politicians
21st-century American women politicians
Year of birth missing (living people)
Democratic Party members of the North Dakota House of Representatives